Eric Chiwaya, a member of the United Democratic Front, is the urban governor for Blantyre, Malawi. On January 8, 2003, he was stoned by a mob which argued that the government was colluding with vampires. Chiwaya survived the attack and denied the allegations.

References

Year of birth missing (living people)
Living people
People from Blantyre
United Democratic Front (Malawi) politicians